Autosomal recessive isolated ectopia lentis is a rare hereditary disorder which is  characterized by ectopia lentis (that is; a condition that displaces the position of the eye's lens) that is present in both eyes with no other significant abnormalities. It is caused by mutations in the ADAMTSL4 gene, located in chromosome 1. These mutations are inherited in an autosomal recessive manner.

According to OMIM, approximately 62 cases from 10–20 families in the Middle East, Western Asia, and Europe have been described in medical literature.

Although no other ocular abnormalities are present in isolated ectopia lentis, the EL itself can lead to other ocular complications directly or indirectly related to it, such as myopia, astigmatism, hyperopia, cataract, glaucoma, and retinal detachment, which may lead to visual impairment (difficulties with vision) or even total blindness.

References 

Rare genetic syndromes